Salcia Tudor is a commune located in Brăila County, Muntenia, Romania. It is composed of five villages: Ariciu, Cuza Vodă, Gulianca, Olăneasca and Salcia Tudor.

References

Communes in Brăila County
Localities in Muntenia